The 2019–20 Asia League Ice Hockey season was the seventeenth season of Asia League Ice Hockey. PSK Sakhalin and Anyang Halla were named joint champions after the league cancelled the Finals due to concerns from the COVID-19 pandemic.

League business

Team changes
During the 2018–19 season, the Nippon Paper Industries Company announced that they would shut down the Nippon Paper Cranes at the conclusion of the season. During the off-season, the league approved the East Hokkaido Cranes as their replacement.

Regular season

Standings
Final standings:

 - clinched playoff spot 
 - Leaders Flag (regular season) champion

Playoffs 
The league cancelled the final on 26 February 2020 due to concern from the COVID-19 pandemic. The semifinal winners PSK Sakhalin and Anyang Halla were named joint champions

Bracket

Statistics

Scoring leaders
The following players led the league in regular season points at the conclusion of games played on 16 February 2020.

References 

Asia League Ice Hockey
Asia League Ice Hockey seasons
Asia
Asia
Asia League